Lorne Donaldson is a Jamaican football manager and former player who coaches the Jamaica women's national team.

Playing career
Donaldson attended and played soccer at Kingston College in Jamaica.  He also played for Cavalier F.C.  in 1980, Donaldson entered Metropolitan State University of Denver.  He was a 1981 NAIA First Team All American soccer player.   In 1995, Metro State inducted Donaldson into its Hall of Fame.  Donaldson also played for the Denver Kickers when they won the 1983 National Amateur Cup.  In 1997, he played one game for the Colorado Foxes.

Coaching career
Following the completion of his playing career at Metro State, Donaldson continued as an assistant coach with the men's soccer team while finishing his degree.  He served as an assistant coach with the Colorado Foxes before becoming the head coach.  He was the 1996 American Professional Soccer League Coach of the Year.  In 1997, he became a coach with the Douglas County Soccer Association.  The Douglas County Soccer Association runs the Real Colorado Foxes, a team Donaldson coaches.  On 29 January 2001, Donaldson became an assistant coach with the Colorado Rapids of Major League Soccer.

In June 2022, Donaldson was named Head Coach of Jamaica Women women's football team. In July 2022, Donaldson lead Jamaica Reggaegirlz to their second consecutive World Cup.

References

Year of birth missing (living people)
Living people
Jamaican footballers
Association footballers not categorized by position
Metro State Roadrunners men's soccer players
Cavalier F.C. players
Colorado Foxes players
Jamaican expatriate footballers
Jamaican expatriate sportspeople in the United States
Expatriate soccer players in the United States
Jamaican football managers
American Professional Soccer League coaches
Women's association football managers
Jamaica women's national football team managers
Jamaican expatriate football managers
Expatriate soccer managers in the United States